Otacílio Pires de Camargo, commonly known as Cilinho (February 9, 1939 – November 28, 2019) was a Brazilian football coach, responsible for the discovery of many talents. He was born in Campinas.

Career
It was he who directed the Sao Paulo team which in the 1980s was named "Menudos do Morumbi", named after the young age of the group and the success of the Puerto Rican music group Menudo.

He won the Campeonato Paulista with São Paulo in 1985 and in 1987, the Campeonato Paulista Second Division with Ponte Preta in 1969,  and the Campeonato Paulista Série A2 in 1999 with América-SP. Cilinho has also managed clubs such as Portuguesa, Sport, XV de Jaú, Guarani and Bragantino.

References

1939 births
2019 deaths
Sportspeople from Campinas
Brazilian football managers
Campeonato Brasileiro Série A managers
Associação Ferroviária de Esportes managers
Associação Atlética Ponte Preta managers
TP Mazembe managers
Associação Portuguesa de Desportos managers
Sport Club do Recife managers
Esporte Clube XV de Novembro (Jaú) managers
Paulista Futebol Clube managers
Comercial Futebol Clube (Ribeirão Preto) managers
Santos FC managers
São Paulo FC managers
Guarani FC managers
Sport Club Corinthians Paulista managers
Clube Atlético Bragantino managers
América Futebol Clube (SP) managers
Rio Branco Esporte Clube managers